Benin , officially the Republic of Benin, is a country in Western Africa. It borders Togo to the west, Nigeria to the east and Burkina Faso and Niger to the north; its short coastline to the south leads to the Bight of Benin. Its capital is the Yoruba founded city of Porto Novo, but the seat of government is the Fon city of Cotonou. About half the population live below the international poverty line of US$1.25 per day.

Topics related to Benin include:

0–9

 1963 Dahomeyan coup d'état
 Dahomey at the 1972 Summer Olympics
 Benin at the 1980 Summer Olympics
 Benin at the 1984 Summer Olympics
 Benin at the 1988 Summer Olympics
 Benin at the 1992 Summer Olympics
 Benin at the 1996 Summer Olympics
 Benin at the 2000 Summer Olympics
 Benin at the 2004 Summer Olympics
 2008 Benin floods
 Benin at the 2008 Summer Olympics
 Benin at the 2008 Summer Paralympics

A

Abeokouta
Abidzi
Abomey-Calavi
Abomey
Action Front for Renewal and Development
Samou Seidou Adambi
Adandozan
Adeli, Benin
Khaled Adénon
Adjalin
Anicet Adjamossi
Adja-Ouèrè
Adjarra
Tiamiou Adjibadé
Adjohoun
Sévérin Adjovi
Jean-Marc Adjovi-Bocco
Frédéric Affo
Afodiobo
African Movement for Development and Progress
Agadja
Agbangnizoun
Fidèle Agbatchi
Berte-Evelyne Agbo
Marcel Honorat Léon Agboton
Agé
Agence Bénin Presse
Moustapha Agnidé
Agoli-agbo
Agongointo-Zoungoudo Underground Town
Agonglo
Agougou
Maxime Agueh
Aguégués
Justin Ahomadégbé-Tomêtin
Michel Ahouanmenou
Jocelyn Ahouéya
Michel Aikpé
Ajaland
Akaba (Dahomey kings)
Akoumokoumo
Rodrigue Akpakoun
Akpro-Missérété
Alafiarou
Aledjo-Koura
Alekpo
Aletoutou
Alexandre Sènou Adandé Ethnographic Museum
Allada
Michel Alladaye
Alphonse Alley
Alori
Moudachirou Amadou
Amawihon
Amedzofe
Amou, Benin
Bruno Amoussou
Valere Amoussou
Ancien Pont Bridge
Robert Anderson (diplomat)
Jean Louis Pascal Angan
Annual customs of Dahomey
Apaki
Sourou-Migan Apithy
Aplahoué
Irélé Apo
Arrada
Arrondissements of Benin
Assion
Nestor Assogba
Athiémé
Atokou
Avrankou
Awonou
Aworo
Martin Azonhiho
Azowlissé

B

 Bello Babatunde
 Wally Badarou
 Daouda Badarou
 Bakaga
 Bakana-Kari
 Bakounkparou
 Bakounourou
 Bakperou
 Aziz Balagoun
 Banikoara
 Baningli
 Bank of West Africa (BAO)
 Bantè
 Baperou
 Bariba
 Battle of Abomey
 Battle of Atakpamé
 Bassila
 Bayakou
 Bembèrèkè
 Bembereke Airport
 Benin
 Benin at the Olympics
 Benin cuisine
 Benin Cup
 Benin Davis Cup team
 Benin Football Federation
 Benin literature
 Benin national football team
 Benin national rugby union team
 Benin Premier League
 Benin Rebirth Party
 Benin–Russia relations
 Beninese constitutional referendum, 1990
 Beninese hip hop
 Beninese parliamentary election, 1979
 Beninese parliamentary election, 1984
 Beninese parliamentary election, 1989
 Beninese parliamentary election, 1991
 Beninese parliamentary election, 1995
 Beninese parliamentary election, 1999
 Beninese parliamentary election, 2003
 Beninese parliamentary election, 2007
 Beninese presidential election, 1991
 Beninese presidential election, 1996
 Beninese presidential election, 2001
 Beninese presidential election, 2006
 Bereyadou
 Olympe Bhely-Quenum
 Rogatien Biaou
 Bight of Benin
 Biguina
 .bj
 Romuald Boco
 Bodi, Benin
 Bohicon
 Bomako
 Yayi Boni
 Bonou
 Bopa
 Borarou
 Borgu
 Bori, Benin
 Boukoumbé
 Boutou, Benin
 Pamela E. Bridgewater
 Gayleatha B. Brown
 Buffles du Borgou FC
 Builders and Managers of Freedom and Democracy
 Béhanzin
 Bétérou

C

 Cadjehoun Airport
 Cana Airport
 CEB-NEPA Power Interconnection
 Celestial Church of Christ
 Rachad Chitou
 Choukachou
 Damien Chrysostome
 Coat of arms of Benin
 Cobly
 Codjo François Azodogbehou
 Coffi Codjia
 Communes of Benin
 Comé
 Tahirou Congacou
 Congress of People for Progress
 Constitution of Benin
 Copargo
 Cotonou
 Cotonou Agreement
 Cotonou Cathedral
 Cotonou Central Mosque
 Cotonou Friendship Stadium
 Florent Couao-Zotti
 Couffo River
 Cové
 Crime in Benin

D

 Dakodonou
 Dahomey
 Dahomey Amazons
 Dahomey Gap
 Dahomey mythology
 Dahomeyan Territorial Assembly election, 1952
 Dahomeyan constitutional referendum, 1964
 Dahomeyan constitutional referendum, 1968
 Dahomeyan legislative election, 1959
 Dahomeyan parliamentary election, 1960
 Dahomeyan presidential election, 1960
 Dahomeyan presidential election, 1964
 Dahomeyan presidential election, July 1968
 Dahomeyan presidential election, May 1968
 Dangbo
 Dantokpa Market
 Darou Kourarou
 Paul Darboux
 Dassa-Zoumé
 Antoine Dayori
 Debregourou
 Democratic Renewal Party of Benin
 Demographics of Benin
 Departments of Benin
 Mariam Aladji Boni Diallo
 Diengou
 Adigo Dinalo
 Djakotomey
 Djidja
 Yoann Djidonou
 Patrice Djokoue
 Djougou
 Djougou Airport
 Alfred-Amédée Dodds
 Richard Dogbeh
 Dogbo-Tota
 Dogue, Benin
 Frédéric Dohou
 Dokparou
 Don, Benin
 Robert Dossou
 Noel Dossou-Yovo
 Douerou
 AS Dragons FC de l'Ouémé
 Dèmè
 Vissinto Ayi d'Almeida
 Laurent D'Jaffo

E

 Economy of Benin
 Angueran Edjekpan
 Education in Benin
 Jean-Marie Ehouzou
 Elections in Benin
 Embassy of Benin in Moscow
 Energy in Benin

F

Pascal Fantodji
Kamarou Fassassi
Adelaide Fassinou
Fabienne Feraez
Fetish priest
First Franco-Dahomean War
Flag of Benin
Fon language
Football in Benin
Forane Kparou
Foreign relations of Benin
Freedom of religion in Benin
French Dahomey
French language
French West Africa
Fula language

G

Ga Yakabou
Gagbebou
Gando, Benin
Gangban
Gangbé Brass Band
Gangnihessou
Ganou
Bernardin Gantin
Ganvie
Gaougado
Alain Gaspoz
Gassagadi
Gatakpal
Béatrice Lalinon Gbado
Daniel Gbaguidi
Marie-Elise Gbèdo
Geography of Benin
Gen language
Ghezo
Glazoué
Glele
John Glélé
Gleti
Luc Gnacadja
Mathieu Gnanligo
Christine Adjahi Gnimagnon
Joseph Gnonlonfoun
Gogounou
Gommboko
Gorobani
Gouforou
Goutere
Goutoungadoni
Grand-Popo
Yury Grashchenkov
The Greens (Benin)
GS Telecom
Guénè
Guiguizo
Guinean forest-savanna mosaic
Guinrerou
Jerome Sacca Kina Guezere
Guérérou

H

Jean-Baptiste Hachème
Guy Landry Hazoumé
Health in Benin
High Council of Kings of Benin
History of Benin
HIV/AIDS in Benin
Théodore Holo
Hope Force
Houegbadja
Houéyogbé
Colette Senami Agossou Houeto
Djimon Hounsou
Adrien Houngbédji
Gatien Houngbédji
Paulin J. Hountondji

I

 Simon Idohou
 Ifangni
 Igbere
 Igbomakoro
 Impulse to Progress and Democracy
 Inkolonie
 Institut National de la Statistique Benin
 Itutu
 Iyo, Benin

J

Jews of Bilad el-Sudan
Paulin Joachim
Réda Johnson

K

 Moussoro Kabirou
 Kabiyé language
 Kaborokpo
 Kabro
 Kadjimani
 Kafingbe
 Kalalé
 Kandi
 Kandi Airport
 Kaoute
 Karimama, Benin
 Karobouarou
 Katia, Benin
 Kemeni, Benin
 Kemetou Alidjo
 Kemetou Penezoulou
 Ketu
 Key Force
 Angélique Kidjo
 Kikele
 Kingdom of Whydah
 Kiparé
 Klouékanmè
 Koakoaliki
 Nouhoum Kobéna
 Kogé
 Kokoro, Benin
 Kokotyi
 Kokou (god)
 Antoine Idji Kolawolé
 Kominde
 Konkoma
 Christian Akande Kotchoni
 Kouandé
 Maurice Kouandété
 Djiman Koukou
 Kouloumizi
 Koumerou
 Gloria Koussihouede
 Koussoukoingou
 Kpartao
 Kpendi
 Kpengla
 Kperou Guera
 Kpomassè
 Kérou
 Mathieu Kérékou
 Kétou

L

 Sacca Lafia
 Lagbere
 Lake Ahémé
 Lake Nokoué
 Lalo, Benin
 Languages of Benin
 Moussa Latoundji
 L'Aube Nouvelle
 Law enforcement in Benin
 LGBT rights in Benin (Gay rights)
 Leopard
 Lete Island
 Liro, Benin
 Littoral Department
 Lokossa
 Gabriel Lozès

M

 Madiatom
 Hubert Maga
 Mahu
 Abou Maiga
 Malanville
 Chabi Mama
 Manafaga
 Manala, Benin
 Manigri
 Matéri
 Mborko
 Mekrou River
 Military of Benin
 Mineral industry of Benin
 Ministry of Economy and Finance, Benin
 Ministry of Foreign Affairs and African Integration (Benin)
 Mogas 90 FC
 Edgar Yves Monnou
 Mont Sokbaro
 Basile Adjou Moumouni
 Moundouro
 Musée en Plein Air de Parakou
 Music of Benin
 [mountain of fire and miracles ministry]

N

 Mathurin Nago
 Nana Buluku
 Théophile Nata
 National Assembly of Benin
 National Library of Benin
 National University of Benin
 Natitingou
 Natitingou Airport
 Tempa Ndah
 Nekinparo
 New Alliance (Benin)
 Ngioro
 Ngmellang
 Niala, Benin
 Niger River
 Nikki, Benin
 Nikikperou
 N’Dali

O

Odokoriko
Odola
Office de Radiodiffusion et Télévision du Bénin
Ogi (cereal ferment)
Ogougouworo
Simon Ifede Ogouma
Ogoun
Mouritala Ogunbiyi
Moussa Okanla
Okouta-Boussa
Okpedie
Assogba Oké
Jonas Okétola
Wassiou Oladipupo
Oscar Olou
Razak Omotoyossi
Pierre Osho
Ouaké
Ouémé River
Ouidah
Ouidah Museum of History
Ouinhi
Ouroungourou
Outline of Benin
Abdoulaye Ouzerou
Ouèssè

P

Parakou
Parakou Airport
Pendjari National Park
Penelan
Penessoulou
People's Republic of Benin
People's Revolutionary Party of Benin
Pepekino
Phla–Pherá languages
Jean Pliya
José Pliva
Pobé
Politics of Benin
Porga
Porga Airport
Porto-Novo
Postage stamps and postal history of Benin
La Poste du Bénin
Prekete
Presidential Council of Benin
Public holidays in Benin
Pèrèrè
Péhonko
Pépépétérou

Q

R

 Florent Raimy
 Rally for Democracy and Progress (Benin)
 Rassemblement Démocratique du Dahomé
 Red star
 Religion in Benin
 Republic of Dahomey
 Requins de l'Atlantique FC
 Sylvain Remy
 Roman Catholic Archdiocese of Cotonou
 Roman Catholic Diocese of Abomey
 Roman Catholic Diocese of Dassa-Zoumé
 Roman Catholic Diocese of Djougou
 Roman Catholic Diocese of Kandi
 Roman Catholic Diocese of Lokossa
 Roman Catholic Diocese of N’Dali
 Roman Catholic Diocese of Natitingou
 Roman Catholic Archdiocese of Parakou
 Roman Catholic Diocese of Porto Novo
 Achille Rouga
 Zomahoun Idossou Rufin

S

Sakouna
Sakouna-Neugbawaperoun
Sakété
Zul Kifl Salami
Sanro
Saramanga
Savalou
Savi
Savé
Savé Airport
Second Franco-Dahomean War
Segboroué
Orou Gabé Orou Sego
Seh-Dong-Hong-Beh
Noel Seka
Senouorou
Ismaël Tidjani Serpos
Stéphane Sessègnon
Setto
Shakpana
Seïdou Mama Sika
Sinendé
Félicien Singbo
Benoît Sinzogan
Société Beninoise de Gaz
Société Nationale de Commercialisation des Produits Pétroliers
Christophe Soglo
Ganiou Soglo
Léhady Soglo
Nicéphore Soglo
Rosine Vieyra Soglo
Saturnin Soglo
Social Democratic Party of Benin
Sokoumeno
Sokouno
Somba people
Songhay languages
Sonoumo
Sota River
Souri
Sourou, Benin
Paul-Émile de Souza
Stade Charles de Gaulle
Stade Municipal de Parakou
Stade Municipale (Porto-Novo)
Stade Quartier Akpakpa
Stade René Pleven d'Akpakpa
Stade de l'Amitié
Star Alliance (Benin)
Samuel Emmanuel Suka
Lazare Sèhouéto
Sèmè-Kpodji
Ségbana
Sô-Ava

T

 Tabayorourou
 Tanguiéta
 Tankaro
 Tankaro Ga
 Benoît Tardieu
 Daniel Tawéma
 Tchaourou
 Tchatchou
 Tchembere
 Oumar Tchomogo
 Séïdath Tchomogo
 Tegbessou
 Telecommunications in Benin
 Teougourou Gando
 Albert Teveodjré
 Tiakpartia
 Tian, Benin
 Tiatiala
 Vladimir Timoshenko2
 Tinekonparou
 Toffo
 Togbota
 Togo Mountains
 Tony Toklomety
 Tonnerre d'Abomey FC
 Tori-Bossito
 Toucountouna
 Tourou
 Touroumini
 Toviklin
 Trade unions in Benin
 Bio Aï Traoré
 Safradine Traoré

U

 Union for Future Benin
 United Nations Security Council Resolution 147
 United States Ambassador to Benin
 UTA Flight 141

V

 The Viceroy of Ouidah

W

W National Park
Wagasi
Walls of Benin
Wansirou
Water supply and sanitation in Benin
Weria
West African Gas Pipeline
West African Vodun
Wetietie
Wildlife of Benin
Salomon Wisdom
Wore, Benin
Worora

X
Xevioso

Y

Yadia
Yakassirou
Yari, Benin
Yoruba language
Yorùbáland

Z

Za-Kpota
Zangbeto
Zangnanado
Zarma people
Émile Derlin Zinsou
Abraham Zinzindohoue
Zogbodomey
Zou River
Zè

Lists 

 List of airlines of Benin
 List of airports in Benin
 List of banks in Benin
 List of Beninese films
 List of Beninese writers
 List of birds of Benin
 List of cities in Benin
 List of colonial heads of Benin (Dahomey)
 List of colonial heads of São João Baptista de Ajudá
 List of companies of Benin
 List of diplomatic missions of Benin
 List of football clubs in Benin
 List of Foreign Ministers of Benin
 List of heads of government of Benin
 List of heads of state of Benin
 List of mammals of Benin
 List of political parties in Benin
 List of presidents of Benin
 List of presidents of the National Assembly of Benin
 List of Roman Catholic dioceses in Benin
 List of rulers of the Bariba state of Kandi
 List of rulers of the Bariba state of Kwande
 List of rulers of the Bariba state of Nikki
 List of rulers of the Bariba state of Paraku
 List of rulers of the Berba state of Gwande
 List of rulers of the Fon state of Alada
 List of rulers of the Fon state of Danhome
 List of rulers of the Gurma Mossi state of Nungu
 List of rulers of the Gurmanche state of Jugu
 List of rulers of the Yoruba state of Dassa
 List of rulers of the Yoruba state of Icha
 List of rulers of the Yoruba state of Ketu
 List of rulers of the Yoruba state of Sabe

References 

 
Benin